Nassi may refer to:

Nassi, French singer-songwriter of Moroccan origin
Fabrizio Nassi (1951–2019), Italian Olympic volleyball player
Walter Nassi (b. 1946), restaurateur, aka Valter
Isaac Nassi, computer scientist and businessman
 Maurizio Nassi (b. 1977), Italian footballer
 Thoma Nassi, Albanian composer.  See Music of Albania.
Thomas Nassi (1892-1964), Albanian-American musician and pioneering music educator

See also
 Nasi (Hebrew title), Biblical term for a leader
 Judah the Prince, from the Hebrew 'Yehuda ha-Nasi' (fl. 3rd century), Jewish religious leader
 Joseph Nasi, 16th-century Jewish diplomat and administrator
 Nassi-Shneiderman diagram, graphical design representation for structured programming
 Nassoi, ancient city in Arcadia